The Heritage-class cutter, also known as the Offshore Patrol Cutter and the Maritime Security Cutter, Medium, is 
a cutter class of the United States Coast Guard (USCG), developed as part of the Integrated Deepwater System Program and built by Eastern Shipbuilding and Austal USA.  Construction of the first vessel in the class began in January 2019.  As they are completed, it is expected that they will replace  Famous- and  Reliance-class Medium Endurance Cutters.

Mission 
The Heritage-class cutters will perform various USCG missions which include but are not limited to PWCS (ports, waterways, and coastal security), defense operations, maritime law enforcement (drug/migrant interdiction and other law enforcement), search and rescue, marine safety, and environment protection. For defense operations the WMSM will meet a range of roles from theater security cooperation to deploying with an expeditionary strike group (ESG) or supporting a combatant commander in various ways. The cutters will also support Arctic operations.

Design
The design is based on Vard Marine's VARD 7 110 offshore patrol vessel design. The cutters will be classified to American Bureau of Shipping Naval Vessel Rules with USCG addendum and will be built with a mix of military and commercial standards. The cutters will have the ability to install additional equipment (armament) and systems to augment their capabilities if required to conduct operations in higher threat environments in support of national security objectives or other missions. The cutters' construction will provide combat survivability against various threats, including combatant-type compartmentalization, uninterruptible power supply to vital combat and damage control systems and sensors, and ballistic materials over critical areas for protection against small caliber weapons and shrapnel. The cutters have increased interoperability with other USCG and Department of Defense assets, which provides increased communications and similar systems with other combatants such as the Mk 110 and the Mk 38, weapons used in both the United States Navy (USN) and the USCG. This ensures that the Heritage class has the required interoperability to execute naval warfare tasks with the USN. These cutters have space and weight reserved for additional weapons systems which would allow them to carry out wartime missions.

Propulsion 
Rolls-Royce will supply the USCG Heritage-class fleet's controllable-pitch propellers (CPP), shaft lines, and Promas rudders, which offer increased propulsive efficiency and improved maneuverability. The Promas rudder, combined with the water-soluble polyalkylene glycol (PAG) lubricant used in the CPP system, delivers an efficient and environmentally friendly propulsion solution. Rolls-Royce will also supply bow thrusters, steering gear, fin stabilizers, and MTU marine generator sets.

Combat suite
The Saab Sea Giraffe AN/SPS-77 multi-mode medium-range naval radar system provides three-dimensional air and surface search functions. The multi-mode naval radar also provides Gun Weapon System cueing and supports the cutter's self-defense and limited air defense capability. The cutters are also equipped with the AN/SLQ-32C(V)6 electronic warfare system, which is a scaled down and lower cost version of the AN/SLQ-32(V)6 SEWIP Block 2 system. The Heritage-class cutters are equipped with the same 220 rpm Bofors 57 mm gun as mounted on the USN's Littoral combat ships and the USCG's Legend-class cutters. The missile defense duties are handled by the MK 53 decoy systems also used on the Legend-class cutters. The Heritage-class cutters weapon and defense systems provide anti-surface capability, limited air-defense capability, and the capability to provide naval gunfire support. The cutter's .50 caliber mounts and Mk 38/Mk 110 combination also give the cutter protection against fast attack craft. The WMSM will have the capability and equipment to escape from a CBRNE and/or TIC contaminated environment.

History
The cutter was originally proposed to replace aging medium endurance cutters with more capable and technologically advanced cutters as a part of the Integrated Deepwater System Program. By 2010 and 2011 some commentators speculated that the entire program was vulnerable to cancellation on budgetary grounds, because of the long delay in finalizing a preliminary design.

A bill passed by the United States Congress on 15 November 2011, imposed conditions on the USCG's capital expenditures, that revolved around the design of the Offshore Patrol Cutter, granting greater certainty to the project.

By December 2011 plans for the cutter started to become more concrete.
Plans to include a stern launching ramp, as on the National Security Cutters and the Fast Response Cutters, had been eliminated on budgetary grounds.

In February 2014, the USCG announced that Bollinger Shipyards, Eastern Shipbuilding, and General Dynamics Bath Iron Works had been awarded design contracts for the OPC. The Government Accountability Office denied contract appeals by VT Halter Marine and Ingalls Shipbuilding.

In September 2016, Eastern Shipbuilding of Panama City, Florida, was awarded a $110.3 million contract to build the first Offshore Patrol Cutter with an option to purchase eight additional cutters.
 On 15 October 2016 the Coast Guard issued a notice to proceed with the detailed design of the Offshore Patrol Cutter to Eastern Shipbuilding.

The first Offshore Patrol Cutter is expected to be delivered in late 2022. In total, the 25-ship deal could be worth up to $10.5 billion. On 21 July 2017, Eastern Shipbuilding completed its Initial Critical Design Review for the Offshore Patrol Cutter. This leads to the Final Critical Design Review for the Offshore Patrol Cutter.

On 3 August 2017, it was announced that the OPC's will be named "Heritage class" and the first 11 OPCs were named. The Heritage-class OPCs are named after cutters that played a significant role in the Coast Guard's history.

On 7 September 2017, it was announced the USCG exercised a fixed-price option to procure long lead time materials for the first Heritage-class cutter. The total value is $41.68 million, this covers various materials and parts needed for the engines, switchboards and generators, steering and propeller components, and control systems. This also includes meeting Coast Guard requirements, and meeting all American Bureau of Shipping Naval Vessel Rules and is the first US Coast Guard cutter ever constructed to meet these very specific requirements. The construction of the first cutter, USCGC Argus (WMSM-915), was planned to begin in the late summer of 2018, with delivery in August 2021.

On 28 September 2018, the USCG exercised the contract option to begin construction of the lead Offshore Patrol Cutter, along with long-lead materials for OPC #2. The total value of the options exercised is $317.5 million. Delayed by the impact of Hurricane Michael in October 2018, steel cutting for USCGC Argus began on 7 January 2019.

On 11 October 2019, the Department of Homeland Security approved a limited extraordinary relief for the offshore patrol cutter contract as a result of damage to Eastern Shipbuilding facilities caused by Hurricane Michael, and adjusted the offshore patrol cutter detail design and construction contract with Eastern Shipbuilding group for up to the first four hulls. The Coast Guard will release a Request for Information to see industry interest in re-competing the remainder of the offshore patrol cutter Program of Record.

On 2 July 2022, Austal USA was awarded the contract for detail design and material acquisition for the fifth hull in the class, with an option for up to 11 hulls in total (hulls 5-15).

Ship list

See also
List of equipment of the United States Coast Guard
Medium endurance cutter

References

External links 
Matagorda deploying and retrieving her Short Range Prosecutor at speed.
Offshore Patrol Cutter at USCG Acquisition Directorate site

Patrol vessels of the United States
United States Coast Guard